Kelvin is an unincorporated community in Rolette County, in the U.S. state of North Dakota.

History
Kelvin was laid out in 1888.  It was named for William Thomson, 1st Baron Kelvin, a British scientist. A post office called Kelvin was established in 1901, and remained in operation until it was discontinued in 1953.

References

Unincorporated communities in Rolette County, North Dakota
Populated places established in 1888
1888 establishments in Dakota Territory
Unincorporated communities in North Dakota